Killing Me Softly may refer to:

 Killing Me Softly (Roberta Flack album), 1973
 "Killing Me Softly", single by The Fugees, 1996 
 Killing Me Softly (Ferrante & Teicher album), 1973
 Killing Me Softly (film), a 2002 erotic thriller starring Heather Graham and Joseph Fiennes
 Killing Me Softly (novel), a 1999 psychological thriller novel by Nicci French, that the film is based upon

See also 
 "Killing Me Softly with His Song", a 1971 song performed most notably by Roberta Flack in 1973, and subsequently covered by several other performers
 Killing Me Softly with Her Song (album), a 1973 album by Johnny Mathis 
 "Killing Me Softly with His Height", an episode of Hannah Montana
 Killing 'em Softly, a 1982 Canadian film
Killing Them Softly, a 2012 American film
Dave Chappelle: Killin' Them Softly, a 2000 comedy stand-up film